This is a list of works for the stage by the German composer Johann Friedrich Reichardt (1752–1814).

List

References
Sources

Bauman, Thomas (1992), 'Reichardt, Johann Friedrich' in The New Grove Dictionary of Opera, ed. Stanley Sadie (London) 

 
Lists of operas by composer
Lists of compositions by composer